Francis William Marshall (30 January 1888 – 24 May 1955) was an English cricketer.  Marshall was a right-handed batsman.  He was born at Rugby, Warwickshire.

Marshall made two first-class appearances for Warwickshire in the 1922 County Championship, with both matches coming against Lancashire.  In the first match at Old Trafford, Marshall wasn't required to bat in a rain which was curtailed due to rain.  In his second appearance at Edgbaston, Marshall made scores of 10 in Warwickshire's first-innings, before being dismissed by Cec Parkin, and 4 runs in their second-innings, before being dismissed by the same bowler.  The match ended in a Lancashire victory by 7 wickets.

He died at Kensington, London, on 24 May 1955.

References

External links
Francis Marshall at ESPNcricinfo
Francis Marshall at CricketArchive

1888 births
1955 deaths
Sportspeople from Rugby, Warwickshire
English cricketers
Warwickshire cricketers